Couturier v Hastie  [1856] UKHL J3 is an English contract law case, concerning common mistake between two contracting parties about the possibility of performance of an agreement.

Facts
Couturier agreed with Hastie to deliver some corn. They thought it was in transit between Salonica (now Thessaloniki) and the UK. But the corn had already decayed. The shipmaster had sold it. Couturier argued that Hastie was liable for the corn because Hastie had already bought an ‘interest in the adventure’, or rights under the shipping documents.

Judgment
The House of Lords held that because the corn effectively did not exist at the time of the contract, there was presence consideration and the buyers were not liable to pay the price. Lord Cranworth L.C. said:

"The whole question turns upon the construction of the contract... Looking to the contract... alone it appears to me clearly that what the parties contemplated... was that there was an existing something to be sold and bought."

See also

English contract law
Frustration in English law
Sale of Goods Act 1979 s 6
.

Notes

English mistake case law
House of Lords cases
1856 in case law
1856 in British law
Greece–United Kingdom relations
Grain trade